Xabier "Xabi" Garalde Gorostola (born 5 July 1988) is a Spanish footballer who played in the Segunda División for SD Eibar as a central defender.

See also
Football in Spain
List of football clubs in Spain

References

1988 births
Living people
Footballers from the Basque Country (autonomous community)
Spanish footballers
Association football defenders
SD Eibar footballers
Segunda División players